Moulin-Neuf is a commune in the Dordogne department in Nouvelle-Aquitaine in southwestern France. It is about 50 km northeast of Bordeaux.

Population

See also
Communes of the Dordogne department

References

Communes of Dordogne